The Cutty Sark is a Grade II listed public house at 6-7 Ballast Quay, Greenwich, London.

It was built in the early 19th century, replacing an earlier pub, The Green Man. It was initially called The Union Tavern, but was renamed The Cutty Sark Tavern when the tea clipper came to Greenwich in 1951.

The building comprises three storeys with widely spaced, Georgian bow windows.

References

Grade II listed buildings in the Royal Borough of Greenwich
Grade II listed pubs in London
Pubs in the Royal Borough of Greenwich